Goni may refer to:

 Goni, Sardinia, Italy
 Typhoon Goni (2020), a list of typhoons in the northwestern Pacific Ocean

People with the name
 Aly Goni (born 1991), Indian actor
 Antigoni Goni (born 1969), Greek guitarist, recording artist and performer
 Arabi El Goni (1920–1973), Chadian politician
 Goni, nickname of Gonzalo Sánchez de Lozada (born 1930), Bolivian former president
 Mohammed Goni (born 1942), Nigerian civil servant
 Raúl Goni (born 1988), Spanish football player

See also
 Goñi (disambiguation)